Ilse Malfroot (born 9 February 1978) is a Belgian-Flemish politician for Vlaams Belang.

Malfroot worked as a financial inspector for the Flemish government before becoming the owner and manager of a chip shop restaurant in Ninove with her husband. Since January 2013, she has been a city councilor in Ninove for Forza Ninove, the local faction of Vlaams Belang. In the Flemish elections of 26 May 2019, she was also elected to the Flemish Parliament representing East Flanders.

References 

Living people
Members of the Flemish Parliament
1978 births
Vlaams Belang politicians
21st-century Belgian politicians